Matthias Ahrens  (born 26 May 1961) is a former German biathlete, cross-country skier and current coach.

Career 
Matthias Ahrens competed as a cross-country skier and biathlete between 1978 and 1984. After his active career as an athlete he became a cross-Country ski and biathlon coach. He is a chartered professional coach certified at NCCP level 5. He is also an internationally certified IFMGA mountain guide and ISIA level 4 certified ski instructor.

In 2004, he became a member of Biathlon Canada's coaching staff at the National Training Centre in Canmore, Alberta.

Achievements 
In 2005 and 2022, Ahrens was named as Biathlon Canada Coach of the Year. In 2012 he was appointed as head coach of the Canadian national biathlon team. 

In this role he coached two athletes to World Cup race wins: Jean-Philippe Leguellec in 2012 and Nathan Smith in 2015. Since then, the Canadian team achieved its first ever male World Championship medal, won by Nathan Smith in the 2015 Biathlon World Championships , followed by a bronze medal at the 2016 World Championships in Oslo in the 4x7.5 km men's relay with Christian Gow, Nathan Smith, Scott Gow and Brendan Green. 

In 2015 and 2016 Ahrens won the Petro-Canada Coaching Excellence Award. After 15 years as a coach with the Canadian national team, he left his role as head coach in April 2019, subsequently being appointed as head coach at the Biathlon Alberta Training Centre.

References

External links 
 Biathlon Canada Media-Guides (English/French; PDF; 1,51 MB)

1961 births
Living people
German male cross-country skiers
German male biathletes
German cross-country skiing coaches